Catherine Ardagh (born 20 September 1982) is an Irish Fianna Fáil politician who has served as a Senator for the Industrial and Commercial Panel since April 2016. She previously served as Leader of Fianna Fáil in the Seanad from 2016 to 2020. 

She was a member of Dublin City Council from 2014 to 2016. Catherine is the daughter of former TD Seán Ardagh. She was an unsuccessful candidate for the Dublin South-Central constituency at the 2016 and 2020 general elections. She is the Fianna Fáil Seanad Spokesperson on Social Protection. She was re-elected as a Senator at the 2020 Seanad election.

References

External links
Catherine Ardagh's page on the Fianna Fáil website

1982 births
Living people
Members of the 25th Seanad
Members of the 26th Seanad
21st-century women members of Seanad Éireann
Politicians from County Dublin
Fianna Fáil senators
Alumni of King's Inns
Local councillors in Dublin (city)